The 1963 United States Grand Prix was a Formula One motor race held on October 6, 1963, at the Watkins Glen Grand Prix Race Course in Watkins Glen, New York. It was race 8 of 10 in both the 1963 World Championship of Drivers and the 1963 International Cup for Formula One Manufacturers. The 110-lap race was won by BRM driver Graham Hill after he started from pole position. His teammate Richie Ginther finished second and Lotus driver Jim Clark came in third.

Summary
By the time the teams – including Ferrari for the first time at Watkins Glen – came to America, Jim Clark had wrapped up the Driver's Championship with five wins in seven races. At The Glen, however, the day belonged to Graham Hill and BRM, as Hill started from the pole and won by more than half a minute over American teammate Richie Ginther. Hill owed much of his success to Clark's dead battery on the dummy grid (used for the first time in F1), and the failure of John Surtees's Ferrari engine while leading with 30 laps to go.

In the first hour of qualifying on Friday, Clark's Lotus equalled his lap record of 1:15.0 from the previous year. Hill and Surtees were right on the Scot's pace, as well, and all three were soon under 1:14. At one point, Hill's BRM jumped out of gear on the back straight and left the track, skipping through the woods without hitting any trees, but at the end of the session, he was fastest at 1:13.4. Jack Brabham was glad just to be at the circuit, after he was unable to find a rental car or a taxi at the airport in Elmira, twenty miles (32 km) away, and ended up hitchhiking to the track with his baggage and racing gear!

On Saturday, Canadian Peter Broeker's Stebro (running a four-cylinder Ford with  compared to almost 200 for the Climax and BRM V8's) dumped oil all around the circuit. The session was stopped for 30 minutes to clean up, but conditions were never again good enough for anyone to better their Friday times, so the top six were Graham Hill, Clark, Surtees, Ginther, and the Brabhams of Sir Jack and Dan Gurney. In addition to Ginther and Gurney, the grid contained five other Americans – Masten Gregory, Phil Hill, Jim Hall, Hap Sharp and Rodger Ward – the most ever in a Formula One field, as well as Mexican Pedro Rodríguez, who was making his Formula One debut.

Race day was bright and clear with a record crowd of nearly 60,000. A dummy grid was used for the first time in a Championship Grand Prix, and when the field moved forward to the starting grid, Clark's Lotus remained still. At the flag, Hill led Ginther, Surtees, Gurney, Tony Maggs, Gregory and Brabham up the hill and through the Esses. The Lotus crew discovered that Clark's battery was dead, and by the time they replaced it, Broeker's Stebro, trailing the field, was already into his second lap.

Surtees made the first move, getting by Ginther to split the BRM's, and then, on lap seven, taking the lead from Hill. Gurney followed him and took second briefly, before surrendering the spot back to Hill. By lap 15, Clark was up into 14th place with his engine still not sounding entirely right.

Hill began pushing Surtees on lap 30. He got by to take the lead after shadowing for two laps, gave it back, took it again two laps later, and finally surrendered it again, settling into the Ferrari's slipstream. On lap 43, Gurney suddenly slowed and then retired from third place with fuel starvation and a chassis failure, moving Clark up to seventh.

After trailing Surtees closely for some time, Hill lost his tow when his anti-roll bar came loose and the BRM's handling changed abruptly. Fighting severe understeer, he began throwing the car into turns to slide the rear end around, flinging stones off the curbs and losing ground to the leading Ferrari. On lap 82, with no threat to his lead, Surtees's engine lost power, and he cruised into the pits to retire. "I was just hanging on to him," Hill said afterward. "He's a very tricky driver. He was gaining a half-second each lap on me until he went out. I think it was a good measure of the difference in our two cars." Suddenly in the lead again, with only Ginther on the same lap, Hill backed off and set his sights on bringing the car home.

The Englishman drove under the flag 34 seconds ahead of teammate Ginther, repeating BRM's season-opening sweep at Monaco. New World Champion Clark took the final podium spot when he overtook Brabham, whose engine had been misfiring for much of the race. It was Hill's first American win, but one that he would repeat in 1964 and 1965.

Classification

Qualifying

Race

Championship standings after the race

Drivers' Championship standings

Constructors' Championship standings

 Notes: Only the top five positions are included for both sets of standings. Only the best 6 results counted towards the Championship. Numbers without parentheses are Championship points; numbers in parentheses are total points scored.

References

Further reading
 Doug Nye (1978). The United States Grand Prix and Grand Prize Races, 1908–1977. B. T. Batsford. 
 Dean Batchelor (January, 1964). "Grand Prix of the United States". Road & Track, 50–55.

United States Grand Prix
United States Grand Prix
United States Grand Prix
United States Grand Prix
United States Grand Prix